"Dreams of Ordinary Men" is a song by New Zealand-Australian rock band Dragon released in August 1986 as the second single from the group's eighth studio album Dreams of Ordinary Men (1986). The song peaked at number 17 on the Australian Kent Music Report.

Track listing 
 7"
 "Dreams of Ordinary Men" (Alan Mansfield, Doane Perry, Johanna Pigott, Marc Hunter, Todd Hunter, Todd Rundgren) - 4:02
 "Start it Up" (Mansfield, Perry, M. Hunter, T. Hunter) - 4:20

 12"
 "Dreams of Ordinary Men" (Mansfield, Perry, Pigott, T. Hunter, Rundgren) (extended)  - 7:11
 "Start it Up" (Mansfield, Perry, M. Hunter, T. Hunter) (extended)  - 7:03

Charts

References 

Dragon (band) songs
1986 singles
1986 songs
Polydor Records singles
Songs written by Todd Hunter
Songs written by Johanna Pigott
Songs written by Todd Rundgren